Paul Leslie Smith (March 19, 1931 – August 18, 2019) was an American professional baseball player, a first baseman and outfielder who appeared in 223 games in Major League Baseball over three seasons (–) for the Pittsburgh Pirates and Chicago Cubs.

His finest season in MLB was his rookie campaign with the 1953 Pirates, in which he appeared in 118 games, batting .283 with 110 hits, four home runs and 44 runs batted in. After three seasons out of the Majors, he returned to Pittsburgh for 1957, playing in 81 games as a reserve outfielder. Sold to the Cubs on May 6, 1958, Smith played his last MLB game a month later and played the rest of his career at the Triple-A level, retiring after the 1963 season.

During his Major League career, he notched 152 hits in 562 at bats, including 16 doubles, seven triples and seven home runs.

References

1931 births
2019 deaths
Baseball players from Pennsylvania
Charleston Senators players
Chicago Cubs players
Havana Sugar Kings players
Major League Baseball first basemen
Minneapolis Millers (baseball) players
New Orleans Pelicans (baseball) players
People from New Castle, Pennsylvania
Pittsburgh Pirates players
Seattle Rainiers players
Tacoma Giants players
Tallahassee Pirates players
Waco Pirates players
American expatriate baseball players in Cuba